Reverend Father Godefroy Zumoffen (1848 in France – 1928) was a French Jesuit archaeologist and geologist notable for his work on prehistory in Lebanon.

He is known particularly for pioneering Lebanese archaeology, and for discovering several sites including the Antelias cave. He produced the first geological map of Lebanon and authored a book about its prehistory, La Phénicie avant les phéniciens: l'âge de la pierre.

Notes

References

External links
 Biography (in French) - Lebanese Museum of Prehistory, Saint Joseph University Website

20th-century French Jesuits
French Roman Catholic missionaries
French archaeologists
1848 births
1928 deaths
French geologists
19th-century French Jesuits
Jesuit scientists
Jesuit missionaries
Roman Catholic missionaries in Lebanon
French expatriates in Lebanon